The UCI Road World Championships – Men's amateur road race was the annual world championship for amateurs for road bicycle racing in the discipline of a road race, organised by the world governing body, the Union Cycliste Internationale. The event was first run in 1921.

Medal winners

Medallists by nation

References

Men's amateur road race
Defunct cycling races
Men's road bicycle races
Recurring sporting events established in 1921
Recurring sporting events disestablished in 1995
Lists of UCI Road World Championships medalists